Sajid Mir (born  or ) is a Pakistani national from Lahore and a member of the terrorist organisation Lashkar-e-Taiba. Sajid Mir was the chief planner of the terrorist attacks in Mumbai, during 26 November 2008. Sajid had also managed the tasks of the 'foreign affairs' of Lashkar-e-Taiba's international wing.

Sajid Mir was initially believed to be a fictitious character as claimed by Pakistan, was later revealed by French magistrate Jean-Louis Bruguière's statement to journalist Sebastian Rotella that Sajid Mir is not a fictitious character. Jean-Louis Bruguiere, during 2009, also stated that Sajid Mir is a regular official in the Pakistan Army.

After the 2008 Mumbai attacks, Sajid Mir was indicted in the United States during 2011. He was sanctioned as a Specially Designated Global Terrorist in the Specially Designated Nationals and Blocked Persons List on 30 August 2012  by United States Department of the Treasury's Office of Foreign Assets Control. He is also listed on FBI Most Wanted Terrorists. China has prevented the United Nations Security Council from designating Mir as a global terrorist under the Al-Qaeda and Taliban Sanctions Committee.

During 2022, an Anti Terrorism Court of Pakistan convicted him of terror financing and sentenced him to 15 years of imprisonment.

Early life 
Sajid Mir was born to a middle-class family in Lahore. His father Abdul Majid, who runs a textile business, went to Lahore during the India-Pakistan partition. Sajid is a son-in-law of a retired officer of the Pakistan Army.

Militancy 
Sajid was associated with Lashkar-e-Taiba chief Hafiz Muhammad Saeed in 1994, and got early access to Zaki-ur-Rehman Lakhvi. Having the protection of the Inter-Services Intelligence (ISI), he also planned terror attacks in the United States, France, Australia and Denmark (the latter for Jyllands-Posten Muhammad cartoons controversy).

Terrorism plot in Australia 
Sajid Mir plotted a terrorist attack in Australia during 2003. For such an attack plan, Sajid recruited Willie Brigitte, a French national who converted to Islam and joined Lashkar-e-Taiba, Willie had also funded him to travel to Australia in May 2003. Afterwards in October, 2003, Brigitte was arrested by Sydney police and deported to France, where in 2007, he was convicted and sentenced to 9 years of imprisonment for the charge of 'associating with terrorists', and Sajid Mir was sentenced to 10 years of imprisonment. Willie Brigitte, who used to train Lashkar-e-Taiba members, confessed that Sajid Mir was well known by the Pakistan Army and Sajid never had any problems roaming in the Pakistan Army's areas.

26/11 Mumbai attacks 
Sajid Mir was the chief plotter of the 26/11 Mumbai attacks. To accomplish the terrorism attack, Sajid recruited David Coleman Headley (Daood Sayed Gilani) and assisted Headley in visiting Mumbai prior to the attacks. After the terror attack, the FBI listed Sajid Mir as the most wanted terrorist for aiding and abetting, bombing places of public use, providing material support to terrorists, injuring foreign government property, killing citizens outside the United States, and other terrorist activities. Sajid has a bounty of US $5 million as declared by the FBI. In 2012, Sayed Zabiuddin Ansari revealed in interrogation that Sajid Mir had visited India in 2005 with a fake name and passport under the cricket diplomacy to watch the India-Pakistan ODI Cricket match at Mohali. Ansari further revealed that after visiting several places in India, Sajid Mir prepared Taj Hotel's miniature model to train the attackers familiar with the hotel's inner places.

In 2020, India sought extradition of Sajid Mir, but Pakistan did not respond.

Arrest and conviction 
Pakistan earlier denied Sajid's presence in their country, and later claimed Sajid Mir was dead, but in 2022, Pakistan arrested him. An anti-terrorism court in Lahore convicted Sajid Mir and sentenced him to 15 years of imprisonment with a fine of Pakistani Rs 4,20,000 in a terror financing case. Pakistan reported to the global terror financing watchdog Financial Action Task Force (FATF) that they have arrested and convicted Sajid Mir and sought removal of Pakistan from the 'Grey list' of the FATF.

In popular culture 
Sajid Mir was portrayed by Mir Sarwar in the 2015 Indian film Phantom.

References

Further reading 
 

1970s births
Living people
Year of birth uncertain
People from Lahore
Participants in the 2008 Mumbai attacks
Lashkar-e-Taiba members
Islamic terrorism in Australia
Pakistan Army officers
Islamic terrorism in India
People of Inter-Services Intelligence
Fugitives wanted by India
Fugitives wanted on terrorism charges
Pakistani people imprisoned on charges of terrorism
People convicted on terrorism charges
Specially Designated Nationals and Blocked Persons List
Individuals designated as terrorists by the United States government
Pakistani Islamists